The Manchu Eagle Murder Caper Mystery is a 1975 comedy-mystery film starring former "Bowery Boys" members Gabriel Dell and Huntz Hall, Jackie Coogan, and Joyce Van Patten. The film is a parody of the 1941 film noir The Maltese Falcon starring Humphrey Bogart. The cast also includes Barbara Harris, Anjanette Comer, Will Geer, Sorrell Booke, Vincent Gardenia, Nita Talbot and Nicholas Colasanto. The film was written by Dell and Dean Hargrove and directed by Hargrove. It was released by United Artists.

Plot
An incompetent mail-order private eye (Dell), aided by a chicken hatchery owner, is called upon to solve the murder of the mail-order private eye's nutty milkman (Gautier), who it is discovered had a secret life where he practiced various animal fetishes.

Cast
Gabriel Dell as Malcolm
Huntz Hall as Deputy Roy
Will Geer as Dr. Simpson
Anjanette Comer as Arlevia Jessup
Joyce Van Patten as Ida Mae
Vincent Gardenia as Big Daddy Jessup
Barbara Harris as Miss Helen Fredericks
Sorrell Booke as Dr. Melon
Dick Gautier as Oscar Cornell
Jackie Coogan as Detective Chief Anderson
Nita Talbot as Jasmine Cornell
Nicholas Colasanto as Bert

See also
 List of American films of 1975

External links

1975 films
1970s parody films
1970s comedy mystery films
American comedy mystery films
American parody films
United Artists films
1975 comedy films
1970s English-language films
1970s American films